"Essayez" is a song by French singer Johnny Hallyday. It was released on his 1970 studio album Vie and as a single.

Composition and writing 
The song was written by Philippe Labro, Micky Jones, and Tommy Brown. The recording was produced by Lee Hallyday.

Commercial performance 
In France the single spent two weeks at no. 1 on the singles sales chart (in December 1970).

Track listing 
7" single Philips 6009 122 (1970, France etc.)
 A. "Essayez" (4:24)
 B. "C'est écrit sur les murs" (3:40)

Charts

References

External links 
 Johnny Hallyday – "Essayez" (single) at Discogs

1970 songs
1970 singles
French songs
Johnny Hallyday songs
Philips Records singles
Number-one singles in France
Songs written by Mick Jones (Foreigner)
Songs written by Tommy Brown (singer)
Song recordings produced by Lee Hallyday